The Rehearsal Club was a theatrical girls' boarding house was founded in 1913 by Jean "Daisy" Greer, daughter of New York's Episcopal bishop, and Episcopal Deaconess Jane Harriss Hall. The residence provided young women pursuing a life in the theater a place to rest between auditions, along with opportunities to socialize and receive simple meals. Within a year, the Professional Children’s School was established in back parlors of The Rehearsal Club.

History
In 1920, the Club relocated from its first home on West 46th Street to a large house on West 45th to accommodate increasing residency. In 1923, the Club moved to 47 West 53rd Street between Fifth and Sixth Avenues, where it remained for over 50 years.  The brownstone and its neighbor number 45, acquired for the Club in 1925, were owned by Rockefeller family members.

The Rehearsal Club served as the inspiration for Edna Ferber and George S. Kaufman's 1936 play Stage Door, which was adapted into the 1937 film of the same name starring Katharine Hepburn and Ginger Rogers.

One of the most noted Rehearsal Club residents was Carol Burnett.  In 1955, she initiated and was featured in a showcase of her fellow Club friends called 'The Rehearsal Club Revue,' which served as an initial career boost for several of the girls. Ms. Burnett sponsored scholarships for Club residents in the 1960s, and fondly recalls her Club life in her memoirs This Time Together  and One More Time: A Memoir. 
 
Although men were not allowed upstairs, many did hang out in the Rehearsal Club’s first-floor parlor. James Dean, before he became a Hollywood legend, often visited the Rehearsal Club and for a time dated resident Liz Sheridan, also known as "Dizzy," then a 23-year-old fledgling dancer on the Milton Berle Show.

In 1979, Rockefeller Brothers Fund sold the buildings at 45–47 West 53rd Street to American Folk Art Museum and the Rehearsal Club closed for good.

Today 
In 2007, Rehearsal Club alumnae gathered and formed an organization with a mission statement to "preserve the name of The Rehearsal Club, protect its legacy and inspire other younger generations".

References 

1913 establishments in New York City
1979 disestablishments in New York (state)
20th-century theatre